Eurysula is a genus of true bugs belonging to the family Delphacidae.

The species of this genus are found in Europe.

Species:
 Eurysula brunnea Melichar, 1896 
 Eurysula lurida (Fieber, 1866)

References

Delphacidae